Brian Bement (born July 2, 1993) is an American soccer player who plays for Chattanooga Red Wolves of USL League 1.

Career
Bement played college soccer at Loyola University Chicago between 2011 and 2014.

Puerto Rico FC
Bement signed with Puerto Rico Football Club of the North American Soccer League on March 31, 2016. Following the regular season, PRFC took part in and won the inaugural Copa Luis Villarejo, earning the team a spot in the 2017 Caribbean Club Championship. Bement scored two goals in the second leg of his team's First Round match-up against Guayama FC. He was released at the end of the 2017 season.

Jacksonville Armada
Following an open tryout, Bement was signed by Jacksonville Armada FC of the National Premier Soccer League.

Forward Madison
In December 2018, Bement signed with USL League One club Forward Madison FC ahead of their inaugural season. He made his league debut for the club on April 6, 2019, coming on as an 84th minute substitute for Josiel Núñez in a 1-0 away defeat to Chattanooga Red Wolves SC. On April 16, 2019, Bement scored as Madison played their first match at Breese Stevens Field, a 2-0 friendly victory over the Wisconsin Badgers.

Chattanooga FC
In February 2020, Bement was signed by Chattanooga FC of the National Independent Soccer Association ahead of the team's first professional season.

Career statistics

Honors
 Copa Luis Villarejo: 2016

References

External links 
 
 Brian Bement NASL Profile
 

1993 births
Living people
American soccer players
Association football forwards
Forward Madison FC players
Jacksonville Armada FC players
Loyola Ramblers men's soccer players
North American Soccer League players
People from Waterloo, Illinois
Puerto Rico FC players
Soccer players from Illinois
Sportspeople from Greater St. Louis
USL League One players
National Independent Soccer Association players
Chattanooga FC players
Chattanooga Red Wolves SC players